Wordless functional analysis is a method of musical analysis developed in the 1950s by the Austrian-born British musician and writer Hans Keller. The method is notable in that, unlike other forms of musical analysis, it is designed to be presented in musical sound alone, without any words being heard or read, and without analytic diagrams of any kind. For this purpose, Keller would construct an analysis in the form of an analytic score written for the same forces as the work under consideration and structured as a succession of 'analytic interludes' designed to be played between its movements.

The focus of such an analysis was the question of how a masterwork could incorporate strongly contrasting ideas and yet still produce the experience of unity and coherence. Keller's position on this issue was made clear in a number of articles:
   

Thus his 'FA' scores are designed to demonstrate that the rich 'foreground diversity' of a piece of great music is 'unified' at a 'background' level. To this end the analytic interludes juxtapose passages of the original work with aural demonstrations of the links between the work's various ideas, seeking to make audible to the listener a normally hidden and unnoticed 'latent unity' underlying the 'manifest contrasts'.

Keller produced more than a dozen of these analytic scores, with the works analysed being by Johann Sebastian Bach, Wolfgang Amadeus Mozart, Joseph Haydn, Ludwig van Beethoven and Benjamin Britten. Several were broadcast on BBC radio and on the Continent in the 1950s and '60s, though only two were published during his lifetime.

The development of the wordless method did not mean that Keller ceased to produce verbal articles and talks on music; in his view, however:

Keller's investigations into 'the unity of contrasts' were influenced by the analytic writings of Schoenberg and Rudolph Reti, both of whom he acknowledged. His discussion of 'manifest' contrasts and a 'latent' level of unity requiring to be revealed through analysis is explicitly indebted to Sigmund Freud's model of dream-formation, which distinguishes between the 'manifest' content of the dream and the 'latent' dream-thought.

Publications
Articles:

Scores:

Hans Keller: 'Functional Analysis No. 1' – of Mozart's String Quartet in D minor, K.421 (The Score and IMA Magazine, 22, Feb. 1958)
Hans Keller: 'Functional Analysis No. 2' – of Beethoven's String Quartet in F minor, Op. 95'. Score prepared by Mark Doran and Val Williams, with an introduction by Christopher Wintle, in Hans Keller, Christopher Wintle: 'Beethoven's String Quartets in F minor, Op. 95 and C# minor, Op. 131', Papers in Musicology, Department of Music, University of Nottingham, edited by Robert Pascall, 1995.
Hans Keller, Functional Analysis: The Unity of Contrasting Themes [1957–62], ed. Gerold Gruber, Peter Lang AG, 2001, 500 pp.

Musical analysis